Andreas Glyniadakis (alternate spelling: Gliniadakis, Greek: Ανδρέας Γλυνιαδάκης; born 26 August 1981) is a Greek former professional basketball player. His pro club playing career started in 1997, and ended in 2020.

In his pro club career, Glyniadakis won two EuroLeague championships. He first won the EuroLeague championship in 2000, with the Greek club Panathinaikos Athens. He later won the EuroLeague championship in 2012, with the Greek club Olympiacos Piraeus. With Greece's national team, he won the bronze medal at the 2009 EuroBasket.

Professional career

Europe
As a youth, Glyniadakis played with the youth teams of Kydonas of Chania, Crete. He then started his professional club career with the Greek Basket League team Panathinaikos Athens. After playing at Panathinaikos, he moved on to the Greek club Peristeri Athens, and then to the Greek club AEK Athens.

In May 2007, Glyniadakis signed with the Italian A League's Virtus Bologna. In September 2007, he returned to AEK Athens. However, he was waived by the club on 1 October 2007. Glyniadakis then joined the Greek team Maroussi Athens. He was the MVP of the Last 16's Week 1 in the EuroCup 2008–09 season.

In July 2009, Glyniadakis moved to the Greek EuroLeague team Olympiacos Piraeus. With Olympiacos, he won the EuroLeague and Greek League championships in 2012. After a season of playing for the Kazakhstan Championship club Astana, Glyniadakis signed with Lietuvos rytas of the Lithuanian LKL League.

On 31 January 2014, Glyniadakis signed a contract with Cypriot Division A side APOEL, and he helped the team to win the Cypriot League's championship at the end of the season. On 30 October 2014, Glyniadakis was signed by the Turkish Super League team Royal Halı Gaziantep. On 23 December 2014, he signed with Enegria Rovinari of the Romanian National League, for the rest of the season.

On 14 August 2015, Glyniadakis signed with Les Lions de Geneve of the Swiss Championnat LNA. In November 2015, he left the Lions, and signed with the Greek club Nea Kifissia, for the rest of the 2015–16 season. On 21 July 2016, Glyniadakis signed with the Greek club PAOK Thessaloniki.

On 4 August 2017, Glyniadakis signed with the Greek club Kymis. On 22 August 2018, Glyniadakis returned to his home land of Crete, after nearly two decades, after he signed a one-year deal with the Rethymno Cretan Kings. Glyniadakis joined the Greek club Ilysiakos Athens, in 2019, and he retired from playing pro club basketball iun 2020.

NBA
Glyniadakis was selected by the Detroit Pistons, with the 58th overall pick of the 2003 NBA Draft. In the 2005–06 season, he played with the Roanoke Dazzle of the NBA D-League. He played with the Atlanta Hawks during the 2006 NBA preseason, but he was cut before the regular season began. He also played with the Albuquerque Thunderbirds of the NBA D-League, and with them, he won the D-League championship, in the year 2006.

Glyniadakis was signed by the NBA's Seattle SuperSonics, on 5 November 2006. With the Sonics, he appeared in 13 regular season games, in which he averaged 1.3 points per game. He was waived by the Sonics on 4 January 2007. 

Glyniadakis' final NBA game was played on January 2, 2007, in an 88–112 loss to the Dallas Mavericks. In his last NBA game, he recorded no stats, and only played for a total of 52 seconds, as he was substituted in at the very end of the 4th quarter, for Damien Wilkins. Glyniadakis also played with the Boston Celtics's Summmer League squad in the 2007 NBA Summer League, in Las Vegas, Nevada.

National team career
Glyniadakis was a member of the Greek junior national teams. With Greece's junior national teams, he played at the 1997 FIBA Europe Under-16 Championship. He won the bronze medal at the 1998 FIBA Europe Under-18 Championship. He also played at the 1999 FIBA Under-19 World Cup, and at the 2000 FIBA Europe Under-20 Championship.

Glyniadakis was also selected to the senior men's Greek national team for the 2008 Summer Olympic Games. With Greece, he won the bronze medal at the 2009 EuroBasket. He also played with Greece at the 2014 FIBA World Cup.

Career statistics

Regular season

|-
| align="left" | 
| align="left" | Seattle
| 13 || 4 || 6.2 || .471 || .000 || .500 || .6 || .1 || .0 || .0 || 1.3
|-
| align="center" colspan=2 | Career
| 13 || 4 || 6.2 || .471 || .000 || .500 || .6 || .1 || .0 || .0 || 1.3

EuroLeague

|-
| style="text-align:left;"| 2003–04
| style="text-align:left;"| AEK Athens
| 14 || 11 || 13.5 || .581 || .000 || .962 || 2.9 || .1 || .4 || .5 || 4.4 || 4.4
|-
| style="text-align:left;"| 2004–05
| style="text-align:left;"| AEK Athens
| 19 || 13 || 9.1 || .612 || .000 || .783 || 1.2 || .3 || .2 || .3 || 4.1 || 2.5
|-
| style="text-align:left;"| 2009–10
| style="text-align:left;"| Olympiacos
| 4 || 2 || 5.0 || .500 || .000 || .000 || .5 || .0 || .3 || .3 || 1.0 || 1.8
|-
| style="text-align:left;"| 2010–11
| style="text-align:left;"| Olympiacos
| 3 || 1 || 6.2 || .250 || .000 || .667 || .7 || .0 || .0 || .0 || 2.7 || .3
|-
| style="text-align:left;background:#AFE6BA;"| 2011–12†
| style="text-align:left;"| Olympiacos
| 9 || 2 || 7.4 || .423 || .000 || .933 || 1.3 || .1 || .3 || .0 || 4.0 || 2.9
|-
| style="text-align:left;"| 2013–14
| style="text-align:left;"| Lietuvos Rytas
| 9 || 0 || 10.1 || .412 || .000 || .700 || 1.7 || .1 || .2 || .4 || 2.3 || .8
|- class="sortbottom"
| align="center" colspan="2"| Career
| 58 || 29 || ? || .519 || .000 || .850 || 1.6 || .2 || .2 || .3 || 3.6 || ?

Awards and achievements

Pro career
 5× Greek League Champion: 1998, 1999, 2000, 2001, 2012
 2× EuroLeague Champion: 2000, 2012
 2× Greek League All-Star: 2004, 2009
 NBA G League Champion: 2006
 2× Greek Cup Winner: 2010, 2011
 Kazakh League Champion: 2013
 Kazakh Cup Winner: 2013
 Cypriot League Champion: 2014

Greek junior national team
 1998 FIBA Europe Under-18 Championship:

Greek senior national team
 3× Acropolis International Tournament Champion: 2002, 2007, 2009
 2008 FIBA World OQT: 
 2009 EuroBasket:

References

External links
 
 NBA G League profile
 Euroleague.net profile
 FIBA profile
 FIBA Europe profile
 Eurobasket.com profile
 Greek Basket League profile 
 Hellenic Basketball Federation Profile 
 Italian League profile 

1981 births
Living people
2014 FIBA Basketball World Cup players
AEK B.C. players
APOEL B.C. players
Albuquerque Thunderbirds players
Basketball players at the 2008 Summer Olympics
BC Astana players
BC Rytas players
Centers (basketball)
CS Energia Rovinari players
Detroit Pistons draft picks
Greek expatriate basketball people in Italy
Gaziantep Basketbol players
Greek men's basketball players
Greek Basket League players
Greek expatriate basketball people in the United States
Ilysiakos B.C. players
Kymis B.C. players
Lions de Genève players 
Maroussi B.C. players
National Basketball Association players from Greece
Nea Kifissia B.C. players
Olympiacos B.C. players
Olympic basketball players of Greece
Panathinaikos B.C. players
Panellinios B.C. players
P.A.O.K. BC players
Peristeri B.C. players
Rethymno B.C. players
Roanoke Dazzle players
Seattle SuperSonics players
Basketball players from Chania
Virtus Bologna players